IDNX may stand for:
 Integrated Digital Network eXchange, a data format and communications protocol
 Internet Domain Name Index, a price index for internet domains